This is a list of notable events relating to the environment in 1969. They relate to environmental law, conservation, environmentalism and environmental issues.

Events
After several oil spills in Europe the Bonn Agreement was signed.
The Council on Environmental Quality is established in the United States.

January
The Santa Barbara oil spill occurred near Santa Barbara in Southern California in the United States.

June
One of the many fires on the Cuyahoga River in Ohio spurs a number of environmental protection measures in the United States.

October
 Amendments to enhance the International Convention for the Prevention of Pollution of the Sea by Oil (OILPOL) were signed in London, 21 October 1969

December
 The Endangered Species Act of 1969 is enacted in the United States

See also

Human impact on the environment
List of environmental issues